Hugh Alden Edighoffer (July 22, 1928 – July 2, 2019) was a politician in Ontario, Canada.  He served in the Legislative Assembly of Ontario as a Liberal member from 1967 to 1990, and was Speaker of the legislature during the administration of David Peterson.

Background
Edighoffer was born in 1928 at Stratford, Ontario, grew up in Mitchell, was educated at Pickering College and worked as a retail merchant in the clothing business before entering provincial politics. He also served on the town council for Mitchell in 1958 and 1959 and was mayor from 1960 to 1961.

Politics
He ran for the Ontario legislature in the 1963 election, but lost to Progressive Conservative J. Fred Edwards by over 5,000 votes in the constituency of Perth. Edighoffer ran again in the 1967 election, and defeated Edwards by 187 votes. He was re-elected without difficulty in the elections of 1971, 1975, 1977, 1981, 1985, and 1987.

The Liberal Party, which had been out of power since 1943, formed a minority government after the election of 1985.  Edighoffer, who had served as Deputy Speaker in a previous minority parliament, was appointed Speaker of the Legislature on June 4, 1985 after the toppling of the Frank Miller's government in a motion of non-confidence. Edighoffer was nominated and seconded for the Speaker's position by the leaders of all three political parties represented in the legislature, and was generally regarded as an impartial officeholder. He was re-appointed as speaker on November 3, 1987 following that year's provincial election. He served in the position for another three years, and did not seek re-election in 1990.

Edighoffer's painting in the Ontario legislature was painted by Istvan Nyikos, a Hungarian-born Canadian artist.

Parliamentary positions

References

External links
 

1928 births
2019 deaths
Mayors of places in Ontario
Ontario Liberal Party MPPs
People from Stratford, Ontario
Speakers of the Legislative Assembly of Ontario